Susan Stinsmuehlen-Amend (born 1948) is a glass and mixed media artist who lives and works in Ojai, California.

Biography 
Born in Baltimore, MD, Stinsmuehlen-Amend was educated at Hood College, Indiana University at Bloomington, and the University of Texas at Austin. She studied painting and drawing before going on to run an Austin, TX architectural glass business, Renaissance Glass, starting in 1973. Stinsmuehlen-Amend studied with glass artists Narcissus Quagliata and Paul Marioni. Marioni invited her to be his assistant at Pilchuck in 1980.

Stinsmuehlen-Amend has been a guest artist and lecturer at many schools, including Penland School of Crafts, Rhode Island School of Design, Rochester Institute of Technology, Tyler School of Art, North Lands Creative Glass (Scotland), and the Pilchuck Glass School (1980-1997). In addition, she served as the first female president of the board of directors of the Glass Art Society from 1984 to 1986.

About her work 
Stinsmuehlen-Amend concentrated initially on experimental pieces that defied idealized standards of beauty, taste, form and pattern. She turned to working in glass because she felt it was more "exciting" to work with. She started creating her fragmented X series around 1978, in which she melded together a pastiche of colors and textures in a post-modern way. These pieces, fabricated with stained glass techniques, were meant to hang on walls, rather than as windows. As one of the few women working in studio glass at the time, her work also had feminist implications. The X was a symbol of how the artist wished to slash through the old, more staid ways of approaching glass.

She crossed between the various methods for manipulating glass and incorporated other media into her assemblage-like pieces, using scraps of everyday material to give them texture, depth, and meaning.

In the late 1990s, the structure of her work moved towards rectilinear, with diptychs and triptychs of contrasted figures and patterns. She broke her compositions down into split segments that were meant to be absorbed together despite being separated into individual panels. She integrated imagery and symbols to suggest narrative.

More recently, Stinsmuehlen-Amend sandwiches individual glass planes of images on top of one another, giving them multi-dimensionality. In these layered wall panels the viewer is meant to see into the depth of the piece but not through it, as would be the case if these panes were acting as traditional windows or screens.

Selected Collections 
 Los Angeles County Museum of Art, Los Angeles, CA
 Detroit Institute of the Arts, Detroit, MI
 Museum of Arts and Design, New York, NY
 The Corning Museum of Glass, Corning, NY
 Oakland Museum of California, Oakland, CA
 The Jewish Museum, New York, NY
 The Renwick Gallery of the National Museum of American Art, Smithsonian Institution, Washington, DC
 Leigh Yawkey Woodson Museum, Wausau, WI
 Carnegie Art Museum, Oxnard, CA
 Wagga Wagga City Art Gallery, New South Wales, Australia
 Nishida Museum, Toyoma, Japan
 Pilchuck Glass Center, Stanwood, WA
 AT&T Foundation Headquarters, New York, NY
 AT&T Collection, Dallas, TX
 American Airlines Terminal, Dallas/Fort Worth Airport, TX
 Veterans Administration Medical Center, Dallas, TX
 The City of Los Angeles, Canoga Park, CA
 The City of Los Angeles, Hollywood, CA
 Christ Church Cathedral, Ashmun/Schweppe, Houston, TX
 Davis, Wright & Jones, Seattle, WA
 Ojai Valley Community Hospital, Ojai, CA
 Marshall Fields Corporate Collection, Chicago, IL
 Voss & Partner, TV-Ateliers, Düsseldorf, Germany

References 

1948 births
Living people
Artists from Baltimore
People from Ojai, California
Indiana University Bloomington alumni
University of Texas at Austin alumni
Hood College alumni
20th-century American women artists
21st-century American women artists
American glass artists
Women glass artists